Nayadet Zulema López Opazo (born 5 August 1994) is a Spanish-born Chilean footballer who plays as a midfielder for Primera Federación club RCD Espanyol and the Chile women's national team.

Club career
López made her debut for Valencia B in 2009, at age 15. She was promoted to the first team in 2010, making her Primera División debut on September 20. On 24 January 2013, she left Valencia due to discrepancies with the coach. She was signed by Segunda División club Hércules shortly after, being presented on February 15. The team was renamed back as Sporting Plaza de Argel a few months later, where López remained until 2016. She joined Santa Teresa in the 2016 summer. She suffered a ruptured anterior cruciate ligament during a training on 6 December 2016, receiving medical discharge on 14 June 2017.

International career
Due to her birthplace and her background, López was eligible to play for Spain or Chile. She chose the latter and was called up for the first time in October 2019. She made her debut on 6 October 2019.

Personal life
López was born to a Chilean mother and a Spanish father in Manises, Spain in 1994. She noticed that she could play for Chile through a journalist in Valencia. So, she started the naturalization process in 2018, what finished in 2019, but she couldn't take part in the squad for the 2019 World Cup due to the closeness with the start of it.

References

External links
Nayadet López at BDFútbol
Nayadet López at LaLiga.es (in Spanish)

1994 births
Living people
People from Horta Oest
Sportspeople from the Province of Valencia
Footballers from the Valencian Community
Spanish women's footballers
Chilean women's footballers
Women's association football midfielders
Citizens of Chile through descent
Chile women's international footballers
Chilean people of Spanish descent
LGBT association football players
Chilean LGBT sportspeople
Valencia CF Femenino players
Santa Teresa CD players
Primera División (women) players
Segunda Federación (women) players
Spanish people of Chilean descent
Sportspeople of Chilean descent
Spanish LGBT sportspeople
Footballers at the 2020 Summer Olympics
Olympic footballers of Chile
Sporting Plaza de Argel players
Primera Federación (women) players
RCD Espanyol Femenino players